"Sophia" is the second single released from the re-release of Nerina Pallot's second album, Fires. It was released on October 2, 2006. It was nominated for an Ivor Novello Award in the category of Best Song Musically and Lyrically.

The single includes Pallot's cover of Kylie Minogue's "Confide in Me".

Charts
Unofficially, it entered at #86 in the UK Singles Chart before jumping to its peak of #32 in its first official week on the chart. "Sophia" is Pallot's second most successful hit single, after "Everybody's Gone To War", giving her a second Top 40 hit on the UK Singles Chart.

The single also peaked at #12 on the UK Airplay Chart in October 2006.

Video
The video for "Sophia" was shot in a desert in Morocco, and directed by John Hillcoat.

In the video, Nerina is playing a piano and singing in the desert, while flames continue to grow around her. During the song, the piano Nerina is playing catches fire but she continues playing it, and finally, Nerina is surrounded in a fire circle. The video is described as 'beautiful' and a great contrast to the lighter video for "Everybody's Gone to War" previously.

The video uses the single version (also called radio edit) which is more upbeat, with strings and pop drum beats. The album version is noticeably much slower with only pretty much the piano as accompaniment.

Track listings

Charts

References

2006 singles
Pop ballads
Songs written by Nerina Pallot
2005 songs
14th Floor Records singles
Nerina Pallot songs